Sunnyside is an unincorporated community located in Leflore County, Mississippi.

It is part of the Greenwood, Mississippi micropolitan area.

Sunnyside is located on the former Southern Railway and was once an important cotton shipping point. In 1900, the community had a population of 250.

A post office operated under the name Sunnyside from 1882 to 1917.

References

Unincorporated communities in Leflore County, Mississippi
Unincorporated communities in Mississippi
Greenwood, Mississippi micropolitan area